The August 2008 European tornado outbreak was a widespread severe weather event which spawned thirteen tornadoes in four countries, one of which killed three people in France. This particular tornado reached F4 intensity.


Meteorological synopsis
On August 3, several areas of low pressure developed. Frontal systems extended from one of the lows, stretching from the Azores to the Germany coastline.

Confirmed tornadoes

August 3 event

August 4 event

Hautmont, France

The tornado initially touched down outside the city of Pont-sur-Sambre, initially causing damage ranging from F0 to F1 in intensity. The tornado then moved through a corn field at 20:28 UTC before causing damage to power lines and roofs of buildings in the northern part of town. The storm rapidly strengthened immediately after hitting Pont-sur-Sambre, reaching F2-F3 strength just about 2 km from the point of touchdown, and a few homes and structures sustained significant damage in this area. At the 20:31 UTC the tornado intensified further and caused major damage to some rural brick homes, one of which was completely leveled to the ground at F4 (T8) strength, and the other sustaining F2 (T4-T5) damage. With winds in excess of 300 km / h (F4), the tornado reached a forested area, debarking or uprooting all the trees within a radius of 150 m. Maintaining its strength, the violent tornado struck Hautmont, flattening multiple brick homes and structures, killing 3 people, and injuring 18 others. Numerous other homes and some apartment buildings had major structural damage, and a sports complex was also severely damaged. Multiple cars were picked up and thrown hundreds of meters, some of which were hurled into buildings, and large trees were denuded and debarked. Small objects from town were also found tens of kilometers away. At 20:35 the weakening but still strong tornado arrived in Maubeuge, causing damage of F2 (T4/5) and F1 (T2/T3) strength, destroying a church tower and damaging many other buildings. At 20:40 the tornado began to shrink in size and strength, causing F0 damage to some trees and structures before finally dissipating at 20:42 not far from the border of Belgium.

The tornado remained on the ground for about 14 minutes with a displacement speed of about 40–50 km/h and winds that have exceeded 300 km / h along a total path of 18.7 km, killing 3 people and damaging or destroying about 1000 buildings with a width of 150m-200m.

See also
Tornadoes of 2008

References

External links
Damage report with photographs of destroyed houses (PDF) (French)

Hautmont, France tornado
2008 in Germany
2008 in the Netherlands
2008 in Poland
Tornado
Hautmont, France tornado
August 2008 events in Europe
2008 disasters in Europe
Tornadoes in France
Tornadoes in Germany
Tornadoes in the Netherlands
Tornadoes in Poland